Kalulushi District is a district of Zambia, located in Copperbelt Province. The capital lies at Kalulushi. As of the 2000 Zambian Census, the district had a population of 75,806 people.

References

Districts of Copperbelt Province
Kalulushi District